The Gawler Football Club was an Australian rules football club that was founded on 21 August 1868  based at Gawler in the Township of Gawler about 39 km to the north-north east of Adelaide, South Australia.

In 1877 it was a foundation club of the South Australian Football Association (later renamed SANFL). It had a period of hiatus from the end of 1880 to 1886 when the club split into Athenian and Havelock. The club joined again this time with Albion and following an application to SAFA the Seniors were admitted for the 1887 SAFA season. However, in the 1890 SAFA season the club where unhappy with the program having only been given 5 home games in Gawler, they subsequently forfeited a number of games including two at Alberton against Port Adelaide, and finished bottom of the ladder with no wins and just two draws. In April 1891, the Club informed the SAFA that they would not participate in the upcoming season.

In 1899, Gawler attempted to rejoin the SAFA senior competition. but it would take another 60 years before a Club north of Gepps Cross would be admitted. Central District Football Club was formed as a brand new Club in 1959 and admitted to the SANFL reserves for 5 years before joining the senior ranks in 1964.

Matches pre SAFA 1877

On Saturday 20 August 1870, it was reported that a football match was played at Salisbury on a vacant piece of land opposite the Mill between 12 members of the Gawler Club and Woodville (who had a few Salisbury gents help made up their numbers). Gawler Captain was Mr. R.C. Sandland and Woodville's Mr. A. Crooks who scored the only goal after 1 hour of play.

On 23 June 1874 it was reported that at game between Gawler and Kensington Football Club at the Park Lands that went on for 4 hours before a crowd of hundreds that failed to reduce in number. The final score was 1 goal each. There was no quarrels during the game and at the end each side cheered the other.

In Aug 1874 on Prince Albert's Birthday Public a match was played at Gawler Park Lands between the local Football Club and Port Adelaide Football Club that went on for 2 hours and was played in great spirits. Robinson from Gawler scored the only goal. A 2nd goal scored by Dawkins from Gawler was disputed owing to the interpretation of one of the rules.

Matches vs SAFA Clubs 1877 - 1886

Following a successful trip to Kapunda in May 1877, the Old Adelaide Football Club played a game at Gawler on 20 June 1877. With a crowd of 400-500 spectators present the game ended in a draw - one goal each. The Gawler Captain was C. E Harris. Gawler's goal was scored by a young promising player - Fitzgerald.

At a meeting held at the institute on 20 April 1880 with a good attendance of members present it was decided that the club colours would be black and blue stripes.

Gawler Albion (Pre SAFA 1881 - 1887)

Albion played 5 games (winning 4) during 1881. President Mr H.E. Bright jr  and Captain J. Fitzgerald. Club colours worn - red stockings and cap, blue guernsey, and black Knickerbockers.

For the first time in 8 years Gawler's Albion Football Club played a game against Kapunda at the Dutton Oval, Kapunda on 24 May 1886. The game being declared a draw - Albions 10 behinds to Kapunda Uniteds 5 behinds. Albions best players - J. Fitzgerald (capt.), T. Cullen, W. Devine, W. Crace, and A. Ross

Gawler Albion hosted Port Adelaide Football Club at Gawler on Saturday 29 May 1886 in a well contested game with the final scores Albion winning 3 goals 16 behinds to Ports 2 goals 13 behinds. Bischoff scoring all 3 goals for the Albions.

Participation in the SAFA 1887-1890
With the good results of the Albion Club and with the reduction of train fares for sporting teams travelling from Gawler approved (Double ticket would only be the cost of a single) further overtures locally continued regarding fielding a team from Gawler in the SAFA.

At a meeting held at the Gawler Institute on 2 April 1887 of over 100 footballers from the Gawler Albion and Gawler Football Clubs it was resolved that the two clubs would amalgamate and make an application to join the Adelaide Association. Following some discussion it was agreed the team would be called Gawler Albion. It was also resolved that the Club colours would be orange and black stripes.

The club was admitted at SAFA General Meeting and confirmation was received at a Gawler Albion Meeting and the following officers were elected :
Patron, Sir J. W. Downer 
President, Hon. James Martin, M.L.C.
Vice-presidents— Messrs. H. Bischof, E. S. Burkitt, T. Fotheringham, J.P., A. Drakard, James Short, R. J. Banter, and J. Rawlings; 
Captain, J. Fitzgerald;
Vice-Captain, H. Bischof ; 
Hon. Secretary, T. H. Willett; 
Association Secretary, B. J. Giles; 
Treasurer, A. Tardif

The Gawler "Albion" Club played its first SAFA match against the Port Adelaide Football Club at Alberton Oval in Round 1 of the 1887 Season losing 0.1 to Port Adelaide 12.28 and finished the season with one win, one draw (both against West Adelaide - no relation to the current SANFL club) from the 11 games it contested.

A summary of the 1887 Season - 11 games played - Won 1. Drawn 1,  Lost 9. Scoring 14 Goals. Goalkickers:— H Bischof 3, Solomon 1, Lonsdale 1, W. Devine 3, Doherty 3, May 1, C. Bischof 1, O. Sanderson 1 

At the Annual Meeting held at Gawler Institute on 20 March 1888 it was agreed to strike out the word "Albion" from the Club name. It was also confirmed that the Gawler Football Club would remain associated with the SAFA.

At a special Meeting held at Gawler Institute on 23 April 1888, with a large attendance present, it was resolved to protest against the upcoming season programme and of the Club being excluded from playing matches on the Adelaide Oval.

A summary of the 1889 Season - 11 games played - Won 4 Lost 7. Scoring 21 Goals. Goalkickers:— Thompson 6, Holbrook 5, Penny 3, C. Bischoff 1, H.Bischoff 1, Cheek 1, Miller 1, Allen 1, Darling 1, Harker 1.

Gawler played its last SAFA game on 6 September 1890 at Gawler Oval in Round 17 of the 1890 SAFA Season against Medindie (later renamed North Adelaide in 1893) which was abandoned at half-time due to torrential rain in the 2nd quarter and officially ended in a "draw" 0.3 to 0.1 (as only goals counted) when the Medindies refused to take to the ground after half-time due to the condition of the oval.

A number of Gawler's most talented players joined Norwood in 1891.

James Thomson 

Charles Bischof

Gawler Football Association

The Gawler Junior Football Association was formed on Tuesday 23 April 1889 by delegates from the following 3 clubs - South Gawler Football Club, Centrals and Willaston. All 3 clubs still exist and now play in the Barossa Light & Gawler Football Association.

1890 - Gawler Souths changed their colours to Blue and White
1891 - Centrals colours were Orange and Black.

Despite Gawler not competing in the SAFA season after 1890 matches did continued against SAFA Clubs from Adelaide.

A match was played on Sat 11 July 1891 between the Gawler Association and South Adelaide at Gawler Oval. Final score Gawler 1–1 to 13–15.

1891 - An end of Season match was played at Gawler by the 1891 SAFA Premiers Norwood vs a team of 25 from Gawler.
Result - Gawler (team of 25) 6 goals 9 behinds, Norwood 5 goals 7 behinds.

1892 - A large crowd attended a match on 13 September at Gawler Recreation Ground against the 1892 SAFA Premiers South Adelaide. Finals Scores South 8 goals 6 behinds defeated Gawler 6 goals 8 behinds. Best on ground was J.J. Thomson from Gawler.

Games were also organised against other Associations. In 1900 a match was played at Gawler against the Adelaide and Suburban Association and it was hoped that this would become an annual event.

Gawler Football Association Placings 1889-1899

1889 - Willaston 1st, South 2nd, Centrals 3rd (Last.)

1890 - Placings
1st - Central Won 7 Drawn 1 Lost 0 (15 pts)
2nd - South Gawler Won 2 Drawn 3 Lost 3 (7 pts)
3rd - Willaston Won 0 Drawn 2 lost 6 (2 pts)

1896 - Willaston 1st, South 2nd, Centrals 3rd (Last.)

Roseworthy Agricultural College joined the Gawler Football Association on 12 May 1897 to create a 4 team competition.

1897 - Willaston 1st

1897 - SAFA nullified Gawler's registration (without notice)  

1898 - Centrals 1st, Willaston 2nd, South Gawler, College

1899 - South Gawler 1st

Gawler Football Association 1900-1939

1920 South Gawler defeated Roseworthy College by 8 pts (after kick a late goal), Crowd approx 2000

1922-1927 Premiers - Gawler South (6 years in succession) 

Competition had expended to 7 teams by 1929 with Rovers, Williamstown-Lyndoch and Hamley Bridge joining.

1929 Hamley Bridge left and Salisbury joined

Salisbury were affiliated with Gawler Association from 1929 to 1933 and 1936 to 1937.

Gawler Football Association post 1949

1949 Salisbury rejoined to form a 6 team competition

Merger with Barossa and Light Association

The Gawler Footaball Association merged with the Barossa and Light Association (Founded in 1934) for the 1987 Season to form the Barossa Light & Gawler Football Association which consists of 9 teams.

Honour board

References

Former South Australian National Football League clubs
Australian rules football clubs in South Australia
Australian rules football clubs established in 1869
Australian rules football clubs disestablished in 1890
1869 establishments in Australia
1890 disestablishments in Australia
Gawler, South Australia